Abul Kalam Abdul Momen (born 23 August 1947), popularly known as AK Abdul Momen, is a Bangladeshi economist, diplomat, and politician who has served as Minister of Foreign Affairs of Bangladesh since January 2019. Momen served as Permanent Representative of Bangladesh to the United Nations from August 2009 until October 2015. He was elected Member of Parliament for Sylhet-1 during the 2018 General Elections. Following his election, Momen was appointed Minister of Foreign Affairs by Prime Minister Sheikh Hasina.

Early life and education
Abul Kalam Abdul Momen was born on 23 August 1947, to a Bengali Muslim political family in Sylhet. His father, Abu Ahmad Abdul Hafiz, was a prominent lawyer who was one of the founders of the Sylhet branch of the All-India Muslim League and took part in the Pakistan Movement. His mother, Syeda Shahar Banu, was one of the leading women of the Bengali language movement. He was one of fourteen children. His elder brother is AM Abdul Muhith, the former Minister of Finance for Bangladesh, and his sister is Shahla Khatun, a physician and National Professor of Bangladesh.

He passed the matriculation exam from Sylhet Government Pilot High School. He attended the University of Dhaka and earned a BA in economics in 1969, and an MA in development economics in 1971.

Career

Momen became a civil servant, serving as Private Secretary to the Minister of Rural Development, Local Government and Cooperatives from 1973 to 1974; Private Secretary to the Minister of Trade and Commerce, and Mineral Resources and Petroleum from 1974 to 1975; Section Officer, South Asia, East Asia and Middle East, Ministry of Commerce from 1975 to 1976; and Director, Office of the President's Advisor on Trade and Commerce from 1976 to 1978. Meanwhile, he completed an LLB in law and jurisprudence from Central College, Dhaka, in 1976.

Momen continued his education in the United States, receiving a PhD in economics from Northeastern University, Boston, Massachusetts, in 1988. He taught economics and business administration at Merrimack College, Salem State College, Northeastern University, the University of Massachusetts, and the Kennedy School of Government at Harvard University.

In 1998, Momen became an economic adviser at the Saudi Industrial Development Fund (SIDF). He left Saudi Arabia in the wake of the 2003 Riyadh compound bombings, and returned to Massachusetts. There he taught in the Department of Economics and Business Administration at Framingham State College until appointed Bangladesh's Permanent Representative to the United Nations in New York in August 2009.

Momen served as President of the UNICEF Executive Board at the international level in 2010. He was vice president and Acting President of the 67th United Nations General Assembly.

Momen was President of the United Nations High-Level Committee on South-South Cooperation in 2014.

Momen's elder brother, Bangladesh's Minister of Finance Abul Maal Abdul Muhith, hoped that Momen would succeed him as a member of the parliament representing the Sylhet-1 constituency in the 2018 general election, which he eventually won.

Yahoo news reports that Momen said in February 2020 that Bangladesh had “no obligation” to provide shelter to Rohingya refugees who were stranded in the Andaman Sea on a ship. He asked the UNHCR to take the responsibility.

References

Further reading

External links

1947 births
Living people
University of Dhaka alumni
Framingham State University faculty
Northeastern University alumni
Bangladeshi diplomats
Permanent Representatives of Bangladesh to the United Nations
Chairmen and Presidents of UNICEF
Harvard Kennedy School faculty
Harvard Business School alumni
Bangladeshi officials of the United Nations
11th Jatiya Sangsad members
Foreign ministers of Bangladesh
Bangladeshi people of Arab descent